Vern Pettigrew (30 March 1908 – 29 October 2003) was a Canadian wrestler. He competed in the men's freestyle featherweight at the 1936 Summer Olympics.

References

1908 births
2003 deaths
Canadian male sport wrestlers
Olympic wrestlers of Canada
Wrestlers at the 1936 Summer Olympics
Sportspeople from Ontario
20th-century Canadian people